Bonnet Creek Resort is a  development in the southeast corner of Walt Disney World. The land, which is not owned by Disney, is bordered on three sides by Disney-owned land and on the fourth side by Interstate 4. It is surrounded by the Bonnet Creek nature preserve and is named after Bonnet Creek, which runs through the property. The entrance is located on Buena Vista Drive, just east of the entrance to Disney's Riviera Resort.

The resort development includes a cluster of luxury and mid-priced hotels, including:
 
 Wyndham Resort
 Wyndham Grand
 Waldorf Astoria Orlando
 Signia by Hilton Orlando Bonnet Creek
 JW Marriott Hotels Orlando Bonnet Creek Resort & Spa, which opened in 2020.

The Hilton and Waldorf Astoria hotels are joined by a  Convention Center.

References

External links 
 Hilton Orlando Bonnet Creek
 Waldorf Astoria Orlando
 Wyndham Bonnet Creek Resort
 Wyndham Grand Orlando
JW Marriott Orlando Bonnet Creek Resort & Spa

Walt Disney World